Rodolfo Fernández (born March 11, 1979 in Asunción, Paraguay) is a Paraguayan footballer currently playing for San Marcos de Arica of the Primera B in Chile.

Teams
  Deportes Ovalle 2005
  San Luis de Quillota 2006-2008
  Sportivo Trinidense 2008
  Sol de América 2009
  San Lorenzo 2010-2011
  San Marcos de Arica 2011–present

External links
 
 

1979 births
Living people
Paraguayan footballers
Paraguayan expatriate footballers
Club Sportivo San Lorenzo footballers
Sportivo Trinidense footballers
Club Sol de América footballers
Deportes Ovalle footballers
San Marcos de Arica footballers
San Luis de Quillota footballers
Primera B de Chile players
Expatriate footballers in Chile
Association footballers not categorized by position